The following is a list of 2016 box office number-one films in South Korea. When the number-one film in gross is not the same as the number-one film in admissions, both are listed.

Highest-grossing films

See also
List of South Korean films of 2016

References

2016
South Korea
2016 in South Korean cinema